Wayne Marshall may refer to:
Wayne Marshall (classical musician) (born 1961), English pianist, organist and conductor
Wayne Marshall (deejay) (born 1980), Jamaican dancehall musician
Wayne Marshall (singer), now known as Marshayne, English R&B singer
Wayne Marshall (ethnomusicologist), American scholar focusing on the musical and cultural production of the Caribbean and the Americas
Wayne Marshall (basketball) (born 1986), American basketball player
Wayne Marshall (rugby league) (born 1963), Australian rugby league player

See also
Marshall Wayne (1912–1999), American diver